Garment District may refer to:

Garment District (Los Angeles)
 Garment District, Manhattan
Garment District, Montreal
Garment District (Kansas City, Missouri)
Garment District (clothing retailer), Cambridge, Massachusetts
 Garment District, Philadelphia
 Garment District, Toronto

See also 
 Fashion District (disambiguation)
 Fashion in Milan
 Savile Row in London